Macon is an unincorporated community in Franklin County, Nebraska, United States.

History
A post office was established at Macon in 1873, and remained in operation until it was discontinued in 1955. It was named after Macon, Georgia, the native home of a pioneer settler.

References

Populated places in Franklin County, Nebraska
Unincorporated communities in Nebraska